Are You Happy? is a 2016 music album by Arashi.

Are You Happy? may refer to:
"Are You Happy? / A Gonna", a 2018 single by Morning Musume
"Are You Happy?", a 2009 single by Days Difference
"Are You Happy", a song by Iron Butterfly from the 1968 album In-A-Gadda-Da-Vida

See also
Are You Happy Now? (disambiguation)